The Three Forks Shale is a geologic formation in Montana and North Dakota. It preserves fossils dating back to the Devonian period.

See also

 List of fossiliferous stratigraphic units in Montana
 Paleontology in Montana

References

Devonian Montana
Devonian southern paleotropical deposits